Dario Campeotto (born 1 February 1939) is a Danish-Italian singer, actor, and entertainer. He was born in Frederiksberg, Copenhagen to Italian parents, Emma and Ernesto Campeotto.

He started performing at the age of ten, but his breakthrough was a victory in the Dansk Melodi Grand Prix in 1961 with the song "Angelique", which went on to finish fifth in the Eurovision Song Contest. Following Angelique, Dario Campeotto released a number of records, starred in theatrical play, operettas, revues, and movies.

Personal life
Dario Campeotto has been married twice and once lived in Italy with his former wife, actress Ghita Nørby, but returned to Denmark, where he is currently continuing his career. He has three children.

Discography

Album

Singles

Filmography
1960: Eventyrrejsen
1961: Peters Baby
1962: Han, hun, Dirch og Dario
1966: Flagermusen
1967: Nyhavns glade gutter
2001: Flyvende farmor

References

1939 births
Living people
Danish male singers
Eurovision Song Contest entrants for Denmark
Eurovision Song Contest entrants of 1961
Danish male actors
Danish people of Italian descent
People from Frederiksberg